A. M. Woodbury may refer to 
Angus M. Woodbury (1886-1964), American biologist
Austin Woodbury (1899-1979), Australian philosopher